RetroArch is a free and open-source, cross-platform frontend for emulators, game engines, video games, media players and other applications. It is the reference implementation of the libretro API, designed to be fast, lightweight, portable and without dependencies. It is licensed under the GNU GPLv3.

RetroArch runs programs converted into dynamic libraries called libretro cores, using several user interfaces such as command-line interface, a few graphical user interfaces (GUI) optimized for gamepads (the most famous one being called XMB, a clone of Sony's XMB), several input, audio and video drivers, plus other sophisticated features like dynamic rate control, audio filters, multi-pass shaders, netplay, gameplay rewinding, cheats, etc.

RetroArch has been ported to many platforms. It can run on several PC operating systems (Windows, macOS, Linux), home consoles (PlayStation 4, Xbox Series X, Wii U, etc.), handheld consoles (PlayStation Vita, Nintendo Switch, etc.), on smartphones (Android, iOS, etc.), single-board computers (Raspberry Pi, ODROID, etc.) and even on web browsers by using the Emscripten compiler.

History 
Formerly known as SSNES, initially based on pseudonymous programmer Near's libretro predecessor libsnes, it began its development in 2010 with Hans-Kristian "themaister" Arntzen committing the first change on GitHub. It was intended as a replacement to bsnes's Qt-based interface but it grew to support more emulation "cores". On April 21, 2012, SSNES was officially renamed to RetroArch to reflect this change in direction.

RetroArch's version 1.0.0.0 was released on January 11, 2014, and at the time was available on seven distinct platforms.

On February 16, 2016, RetroArch became one of the first ever applications to implement support for the Vulkan graphics API, having done so on the same day of the API's official release day.

On November 27, 2016, the Libretro Team announced that, alongside Lakka (LibreELEC-based RetroArch operating system), RetroArch would be on the Patreon crowdfunding platform to allow providing bounties for developers who fix specific software bugs and to cover the costs for matchmaking servers.

In December 2016, GoGames – a company contracted by video game developer and publisher Sega – approached the RetroArch developers with the intention of using their software in their SEGA Forever project but ultimately the cooperation did not come to fruition due to licensing disagreements.

In April 2018, an input lag compensation feature called "Run-Ahead" was added.

The Libretro Team planned to release RetroArch onto Steam as a free download, integrating Steamworks features into the platform in July 2019. It would have been the first major dedicated emulation title to be released on the platform at the time.

In August 2020, someone impersonating a trusted member of the team got access to the buildbot server and the GitHub account for the libretro organization, causing vandalism and server wipes.

In November 2020, RetroArch in conjunction with a PCSX2 libretro core allowed the Xbox Series X and Series S to emulate the PlayStation 2, something that Sony's own PlayStation 5 could not do at the time.

On September 14, 2021, RetroArch was released on Steam.

Features 

Its major features include:
 Advanced GPU shader support - A multi-pass post-processing shader pipeline to allow efficient usage of image scaling algorithms, emulation of complex CRT, NTSC video artifacts and other effects;
 Dynamic Rate Control to synchronize video and audio while smoothing out timing imperfections;
 FFmpeg recording - Built-in support for lossless video recording using FFmpeg's libavcodec;
 Gamepad abstraction layer called Retropad;
 Gamepad auto-configuration - Zero-input needed from the user after plugging gamepads in;
 Peer-to-peer netplay that uses a rollback technique similar to GGPO;
 Audio DSP plugins like an equalizer, reverb and other effects;
 Advanced savestate features - Automatic savestate loading, disabling SRAM overwriting, etc.;
 Frame-by-frame gameplay rewinding;
 Button overlays for touchscreen devices like smartphones;
 Thumbnails of game box art;
 Low input and audio lag options;
 Automatically build categorized playlists by scanning directories for games/ROMs;
 Multiple interfaces including: CLI, XMB (optimized for gamepads), GLUI/MaterialUI (optimized for touch devices), RGUI and Ozone (available everywhere);
 Game ROM scanner - Automatically constructs playlists by comparing the hashsums of a directory's files against databases of hashsums of known good game copies;
 Libretro database of cores, games, cheats, etc.;
 OpenGL and Vulkan API support;
Run-Ahead - Hide the input lag of emulated systems by using both savestates and fast-forwarding;
 Achievement tracking - Integration with the RetroAchievements service to unlock trophies and badges;
AI Service - Uses machine translation external services to translate game text on screen.

Supported systems 
RetroArch can run any libretro core. While RetroArch is available for many platforms, the availability of a specific core varies per platform.

Below is a non-exhaustive table of which systems are available to RetroArch and what project the core is based on:

Reception 
RetroArch has been praised for the number of systems and games it can play under a single interface.

It has been criticized for how difficult it is to configure, due to the extensive number of options available to the user, and at the same time has been praised for the more advanced features it possesses.

On Android, it has been praised for the fact that overlays can be customized, for the expandability of the libretro cores it supports, for its compatibility with several USB and Bluetooth controller peripherals, in addition to the app being free and having no ads.

Tyler Loch, writing for Ars Technica, said that RetroArch's 'Run-Ahead' feature is "arguably the biggest improvement to the experience the retro gaming community has yet seen".

See also 

List of free and open-source software packages
List of video game emulators

References

External links
 

Android emulation software
Arcade video game emulators
Atari 2600
Doom (franchise)
DOS emulators
Free and open-source Android software
Free emulation software
Game Boy Advance emulators
Game Boy emulators
MSX
Nintendo DS emulators
Nintendo Entertainment System emulators
PlayStation emulators
Sega Genesis emulators
Sega Master System emulators
Sega Saturn
Super Nintendo Entertainment System emulators
TurboGrafx-16 emulators